Stactobia is a genus of insects belonging to the family Hydroptilidae.

The species of this genus are found in Eurasia.

Species:
 Stactobia algira Vaillant, 1951
 Stactobia alpina Bertuetti, Lodovici & Valle, 2004

References

Hydroptilidae
Trichoptera genera